In geometry, a Danzer set is a set of points that touches every convex body of unit volume. Ludwig Danzer asked whether it is possible for such a set to have bounded density. Several variations of this problem remain unsolved.

Density
One way to define the problem more formally is to consider the growth rate of a set  in  Euclidean space, defined as the function that maps a real number  to the number of points of  that are within distance  of the origin. Danzer's question is whether it is possible for a Danzer set to have growth  expressed in big O notation. If so, this would equal the growth rate of well-spaced point sets like the integer lattice (which is not a Danzer set).

It is possible to construct a Danzer set of growth rate that is within a polylogarithmic factor  For instance, overlaying rectangular grids whose cells have constant volume but differing aspect ratios can achieve a growth rate 
Constructions for Danzer sets are known with a somewhat slower growth rate,  but the answer to Danzer's question remains unknown.

Bounded coverage
This version has been solved: it is impossible for a Danzer set with this property to exist.

Separation
A third variation of the problem, still unsolved, is Conway's dead fly problem. John Horton Conway recalled that, as a child, he slept in a room with wallpaper whose flower pattern resembled an array of dead flies, and that he would try to find convex regions that did not have a dead fly in them.
In Conway's formulation, the question is whether there exists a Danzer set in which the points of the set (the dead flies) are separated at a bounded distance from each other. Such a set would necessarily also have an upper bound on the distance from each point of the plane to a dead fly (in order to touch all circles of unit area), so it would form a Delone set, a set with both lower and upper bounds on the spacing of the points. It would also necessarily have growth  so if it exists then it would also solve the original version of Danzer's problem. Conway offered a $1000 prize for a solution to his problem, as part of a set of problems also including Conway's 99-graph problem, the analysis of sylver coinage, and the thrackle conjecture.

Additional properties
It is also possible to restrict the classes of point sets that may be Danzer sets in other ways than by their densities. In particular, they cannot be the union of finitely many lattices, they cannot be generated by choosing a point in each tile of a substitution tiling (in the same position for each tile of the same type), and they cannot be generated by the cut-and-project method for constructing aperiodic tilings. Therefore, the vertices of the pinwheel tiling and Penrose tiling are not Danzer sets.

See also
Heilbronn triangle problem, on sets of points that do not form triangles of small area
Minkowski's theorem, that every unit-volume closed convex body that is centrally symmetric around the origin contains a nonzero point of the half-integer lattice

References

Convex analysis
Metric geometry